Les Amants du Flore (The Lovers of Flore) is a 2006 French TV film, directed by Ilan Duran Cohen, about the relationship between Jean-Paul Sartre and Simone de Beauvoir beginning with their university years, then the following 20 years through the wartime, post-war fame and publication of Le Deuxième Sexe. It was made in April 2006 and broadcast on France 3 on 6 September 2006.

Plot
In 1924 Simone de Beauvoir is a brilliant, but reserved young girl, who prepares to study philosophy at the Sorbonne university. Only fellow student Jean-Paul Sartre (who calls her 'Castor') recognizes her talent and intellect. Meanwhile De Beauvoir also explores her bisexuality.

Cast
 Anna Mouglalis : Simone de Beauvoir
 Lorànt Deutsch : Jean-Paul Sartre
 Caroline Sihol : Françoise de Beauvoir
 Kal Weber : Nelson Algren
 Clémence Poésy : Lumi
 Julien Baumgartner : Tyssen
 Sarah Stern : Tania
 Didier Sandre : Georges de Beauvoir
 Jennifer Decker : Marina
 Vladislav Galard : Paul Nizan
 Laetitia Spigarelli : Lola
 Robert Plagnol : Albert Camus
 Philippe Bardy : François Mauriac
 Nada Strancar : Principal

References

External links
 
 Allo Ciné page (in French)

2006 television films
2006 drama films
2006 films
2006 LGBT-related films
Albert Camus
Biographical films about philosophers
Biographical films about writers
Cultural depictions of Jean-Paul Sartre
Cultural depictions of Simone de Beauvoir
Female bisexuality in film
Films directed by Ilan Duran Cohen
Films set in France
Films set in Paris
Films set in the 1920s
Films set in universities and colleges
Films shot in France
French biographical films
French drama films
French LGBT-related films
French television films
Lesbian-related films
LGBT-related drama films
LGBT-related films based on actual events
Teen LGBT-related films
2000s French films